Isabella Gifford (1825–1891) was a Welsh-born botanist. In 1848, she published The Marine Botanist, a book which focuses on algology. Some of her specimens are in the Ulster Museum.

Biography 
Isabella Gifford was born at Defynnog, Brecknockshire, Wales, in 1825. She was the first child of Isabella Christie and Captain George St John Gifford, who were married the year before.

She lived in France, Jersey, and for a time at Falmouth before settling with her parents in Minehead, Somerset, around 1850.

Gifford seems to have been mostly self-taught as a scientist with a variety of family links to science. Her uncles included Dr Thomas Southwood Smith and Richard Cowling Taylor.

Studies in botany 
Isabella Gifford was primarily an algologist, studying algae.

In 1848 she published The Marine Botanist; an introduction to the study of algology, containing descriptions of the commonest British sea-weeds. According to the Journal of Botany, this 1848 study of British seaweeds was "well received".

She contributed to the proceedings of the Somerset Archaeological and Natural History Society in 1851.

Though she primarily studied algae, Gifford was survived by her collections of vascular plants and mosses, many of which are now contained within museums including Bolton Museum and Art Gallery and St Andrews University Botany Department.

References 

1825 births
1891 deaths
19th-century British botanists
19th-century British women scientists
19th-century Welsh scientists
19th-century Welsh writers
19th-century Welsh women writers
British women botanists
British phycologists
Women phycologists
People from Brecknockshire
Welsh botanists